Waberi Hachi (born 16 April 1981 in Djibouti) is a footballer for the Djiboutian soccer team.

Hachi made his international senior debut against Malawi on May 31, 2008. He was part of the Djibouti squad for 2010 FIFA World Cup qualification.

References

1981 births
Living people
Djiboutian footballers
Djibouti international footballers
Association football defenders
Djibouti Premier League players